Boccia at the 1996 Summer Paralympics consisted of five events. All events were mixed, meaning that men and women competed together.

The 1996 Games marked the first year of separate competition for boccia players using an assistive device; a ramp or chute for delivering the balls onto the court. This group of very severely physically impaired athletes, unable to propel balls onto court using their limbs, would later become the separate BC3 classification.

Medal table

Participating nations

Medal summary

References 

 

1996 Summer Paralympics events
1996
1996 in bowls